The Hugihorn (3,647 m) is a peak of the Bernese Alps, overlooking the Unteraar Glacier in the canton of Bern. It lies south of the Klein Lauteraarhorn, on the range separating the Strahlegg Glacier from the Lauteraar Glacier, both tributaries of the Unteraar Glacier.

The mountain was named after the Swiss geologist Franz Joseph Hugi.

See also
List of mountains of Switzerland named after people

References

External links
 Hugihorn on Hikr

Bernese Alps
Mountains of the Alps
Alpine three-thousanders
Mountains of Switzerland
Mountains of the canton of Bern